Henning Helgesson (28 March 1900 – 25 September 1986) was a Swedish football midfielder.

References

1900 births
1986 deaths
Association football midfielders
Swedish footballers
Sweden international footballers
Örgryte IS players
Allsvenskan players